Raymond Abad (born 17 December 1930) is a former French football player and manager. He was born in Marrakech in Morocco.

Career
During his playing career, Abad played as a goalkeeper in the French Ligue 1 and Ligue 2 for Limoges and Grenoble.

After retiring from playing, Abad became a manager. First he managed Ligue 2 side Grenoble from 1967 until 1969. After leaving Grenoble, Abad joined fourth division outfit Chamois Niortais. In his first season, 1969–1970 the club gained promotion to Division 3. Following his successful spell with Chamois Niortais, Abad had a five-year tenure at Cholet, where the team won promotion to Division 2 in 1975.

Managerial statistics

References
Raymond Abad profile at chamoisfc79.fr
Player profile at footballdatabase.eu

1930 births
Living people
French footballers
French football managers
Limoges FC players
Grenoble Foot 38 players
Grenoble Foot 38 managers
Chamois Niortais F.C. managers
Ligue 1 players
Ligue 2 players

Association football goalkeepers
French expatriates in Morocco